William Munro may refer to:

 William Munro (botanist) (1818–1880), English army officer, plant collector and botanist
 William A. Munro (born 1992), Australian rugby player
 William B. Munro (1875–1957), Canadian historian and political scientist
 William Munro, 12th Baron of Foulis (died 1505), Scottish clan chief

See also 
 William Munroe (disambiguation)